Scaregivers is a 2008 Filipino horror-comedy film written by Jourdan Sebastian and directed by Uro Q. dela Cruz, starring Wally Bayola and Jose Manalo.

Plot
Two crooks Bob (Wally Bayola) and Billy (Jose Manalo) stole some jewelries while the employees are busy. They were captured and imprisoned, but they devised a plan. They put seals on their attorney's (Ryan Yllana) peanut butter jar and pass them off as stool samples, then they devour it on front of the court, which decided they are insane and must be imprisoned at a mental health facility.

The duo immediately build a plan to escape the facility, by hiding in caskets ready for burial. Then their accomplice will exhume them and let them escape. But their plan had a problem, a nurse Marcia Cunanan (Iza Calzado) acts as their nurse-in-charge, as well as Dra. Jessica Lopez (Ehra Madrigal) the head doctor, forcing them in horrific situations. During their stay they hear a story about Ramil (Paolo Contis) who claims to be a criminal that acts insane in order to escape the law and tried to escape by pretending to be dead and gets buried in the next door cemetery but died as a result. The duo try to pull off the same plan, but later split when one of them hesitates and tries to find another way out.

The one who continued the plan (Bob) was buried, but his accomplice (their attorney) gets into a car accident. The nurse was revealed to be a ghost, jealous because Ramil loved Jessica more than her commits suicide starts terrorizing the duo. Ramil, after he was buried alive along with the Marcia reveals himself as a ghost, wrestles control on them and saves them.

Many days later, they relented and confessed their sins, the corpses were reburied, and many years later, they volunteer in the same mental facility as caregivers.

Cast

 Jose Manalo as Billy
 Wally Bayola as Bob
 Iza Calzado as Nurse Marcia Cunanan
 Paolo Contis as Ramil
 Ehra Madrigal as Dra. Jessica Lopez
 Vic Sotto as Specialist Doctor
 Ryan Yllana as Atty. Denmark
 Boy Abunda as Talk Show Host
 Marian Rivera as Jewelry Shop Saleslady
 Julia Clarete as Policewoman
 John Apacible as Ramon
 Jourdan Sebastian as Peter
 Lilia Cuntapay as Tandang Luring
 Edgar Allan Guzman as Orderly 1
 Arkin da Silva as Orderly 2
 Menggie Cobarrubias as Jewelry Shop Manager
 Carlito Campos as TV Reporter
 Perry Escaño as Dr. Joey
 Jack Rodrigo as Paul
 J.B. de Leon as Jack
 Myrnell Trinidad as Cecilia
 Eddie Geronimo as Multong Frog
 Nonong de Andres as Prison Cell Mayor
 Michael Yonting as Pulis 1
 Tado Jimenez as Pulis 2
 Ricky Tangco as Pulis 3

Reception

References

External links
 Scaregivers at the Internet Movie Database

2008 films
Regal Entertainment films
Filipino-language films
2000s Tagalog-language films
Philippine thriller films
Philippine horror films
M-Zet Productions films